Palina Slancheuskaya (born January 23, 2006, in Minsk, Belarus) is a Belarusian group rhythmic gymnast. She is the 2019 World Junior Group All-Around bronze medalist and the 2019 European Junior Group All-Around silver medalist.

Career

Junior 
Palina was born in Minsk on January 23, 2006. She began training in rhythmic gymnastics at age 5. She was a member of Belarusian Group that competed at the 2019 World Junior Championships in Moscow, Russia taking the bronze medal in Group All-around event scoring a total of (43.100) behind Italy (45.100) and Russia (49.550). They also won silver medal in 5 Ribbons final and bronze in 5 Hoops final.

In 2020, she started competing as individual again. She was a member of Belarusian team together with Dina Agisheva and Yelyzaveta Zorkina that competed at the 2020 Junior European Championships in Kyiv, Ukraine. She finished on 4th place in Rope Qualifications and 3rd place in Ribbon Qualifications, but did not advance into apparatus finals due to one per country rule.

In 2021, she returened to competing in group. She took part in 2021 Junior European Championships in Varna, Bulgaria, where she and Belarusian group took bronze medal in 5 Balls final. They took 5th place in Group All-around event and 4th place in 5 Ribbons final.

References

External links
 
 

2006 births
Living people
Belarusian rhythmic gymnasts
Gymnasts from Minsk
Medalists at the Junior World Rhythmic Gymnastics Championships
Medalists at the Rhythmic Gymnastics World Championships
Medalists at the Rhythmic Gymnastics European Championships
21st-century Belarusian women